Double-H Boots manufactures western footwear. It is owned by H.H. Brown, a subsidiary of Berkshire Hathaway.

History
Double-H Boots began in 1955 in Richland, Pennsylvania.  The original factory location was an area shoe company that had other facilities in the Reading area and had no future needs for the plant in Richland.  The H.H. Brown Shoe Company purchased the building, looking for a location to manufacture western footwear.

The Richland facility was named the Richland Shoe Co. and began producing cowboy boots and work footwear. Shortly after production, a competitor introduced a new style called a "harness boot." H.H. Brown introduced a similar product called a "snoot Boot" and made it at Richland Shoe for a lower cost. For many years, it was almost the total production of the Richland plant.
Richland shared sales personnel with the Carolina Shoe Company and for some time had a single sales manager. The western side at Richland continued to grow and a separate sales force and management was created.

By the 1970s, western boots had become the majority of boots produced.  The Richland plant was the first in the United States to manufacture western boots with a safety toe, the first boots to pass the now standard Class 75 ANSI tests for safety footwear. When computerized fancy stitch machines hit the shoe market, the line expanded into the dress western boot business.
In 1981, it was necessary to expand again. A facility was located in Womelsdorf, Pennsylvania, that was large enough for manufacturing and warehouse space.  In 1993 the name was changed to Double-H Boots to reflect the company heritage of H.H. Brown.

Double H. Boot Co.’s plant in Womelsdorf closed its doors in June 2007, leaving 135 workers jobless. Production of the majority of the work and dress western style boots was then transferred to the company's larger production facility in Martinsburg, Blair County, Pennsylvania. The casual and fashion lines of Double-H are produced overseas.

In the spring of 2002, Double-H Boots purchased the Acme Boot Company and rolled out a new line of men's, women's and children's boots under the Acme name.

In 1995, Double-H debuted the Sonora line of western inspired fashion footwear for women.  Sonora is a seasonal fashion line with launches twice a year.  Plans are to expand the line to include men's fashion boots in 2006.

Double-H continues a relationship started in 1997 with the Professional Bull Riders (PBR) organization and sponsors several bull riders and rodeo athletes.  Double-H is also affiliated with national and local rodeo associations and events.

References

External links
Brand site – doublehboots.com
Corporate parent – hhbrown.com

Shoe companies of the United States
Companies based in Lebanon County, Pennsylvania
American companies established in 1955
1955 establishments in Pennsylvania
Manufacturing companies based in Pennsylvania
Berkshire Hathaway